Koszalin-Zegrze Pomorskie Airport  is a domestic passenger airport serving Koszalin. Its most popular flights include domestic and charter routes to Kołobrzeg, a seaside resort. The runways spans a length of 2,400 meters long and is 60 meters wide. The airport is connected to the Koszalin city centre by rail.

History
In 1979, the airport served 85,853 passengers, and in 1986–1991, on average served 50–55 thousand passengers annually.
Former destinations included Katowice.

Airport infrastructure
The passenger terminal was demolished in the 1990s. There is no infrastructure for passenger services at the airport.

References

External links
 landing information
 website with photos of the airport
 Port Lotniczy Koszalin- unofficial website of the revitalisation campaign

Airports in Poland
Koszalin County
Buildings and structures in West Pomeranian Voivodeship